Moscova is an underground station on Line 2 of the Milan Metro. The station was opened on 3 March 1978 as part of the extension from Garibaldi FS to Cadorna. The distance from the Lanza station is 550 meters.

The station is located on Via della Moscova, near Largo La Foppa, within the city centre of Milan. It allows riders to quickly reach the Parco Sempione and the Arena Civica.

References

External links

Line 2 (Milan Metro) stations
Railway stations opened in 1978